Cerambylaelaps is a genus of mites in the family Laelapidae.

Species
 Cerambylaelaps nadchatrami M.Costa, 1979

References

Laelapidae